Lartebiokoshie is a town in the Ablekuma Central Municipal Assembly, a district of the Greater Accra Region of Ghana.

References

Populated places in the Greater Accra Region